Roger L. Greene is a professor at Palo Alto University. He received the Bruno Klopfer Award in 2010.

He worked on self-report measures of personality, particularly the Minnesota Multiphasic Personality Inventory.

References

21st-century American psychologists
Living people
Year of birth missing (living people)
Place of birth missing (living people)
Palo Alto University faculty